Campanilidae are a taxonomic family of sea snails, marine gastropod molluscs in the clade Sorbeoconcha (an alternative representation of the clade Caenogastropoda).

Taxonomy
There are no subfamilies in Campanilidae recognized in the taxonomy of Bouchet & Rocroi (2005).

Genera
Genera within the family Campanilidae include:
 Campanile Bayle [in P. Fisher], 1864 - type genus; type species of this genus is fossil

References

Further reading 
 Kiel S., Bandel K., Banjac N. & Perrilliat M. C. (2000). "On Cretaceous Campanilidae (Caenogastropoda, Mollusca)". Freiberger Forschungshefte ser. C, 490(8): 67-132. page 89. abstract

External links